Aurillac station (French: Gare d'Aurillac) is a French railway station in Aurillac, Auvergne-Rhône-Alpes, France. The station is located on the Figeac–Arvant railway line. The station is served by TER (local) services operated by the SNCF.

Train services 
The following services call at Aurillac as of 2022:
local service (TER Auvergne-Rhône-Alpes) Clermont-Ferrand - Issoire - Neussargues - Aurillac
local service (TER Auvergne-Rhône-Alpes) Brive-la-Gaillarde - Aurillac
local service (TER Occitanie) Toulouse - Figeac - Aurillac

See also 

 List of SNCF stations in Auvergne-Rhône-Alpes

References

External links
 

Railway stations in Auvergne-Rhône-Alpes